Xerocampylaea waldemari is a species of air-breathing land snail, a pulmonate gastropod mollusk in the family Hygromiidae, the hairy snails and their allies. It was for long time seen as a member of the genus Trochulus, but moved to the genus Xerocampylaea after more comprehensive research. This species is endemic to Bosnia and Herzegovina.

References

Hygromiidae
Gastropods described in 1912